"King Henry" is Child ballad 32, Roud 3967.

It is a version of the tale of the loathly lady. This form of the tale appears in Hrólfr Kraki's saga and also in the Scottish tale "The Daughter Of King Under-Waves". A similar bride is found in "The Marriage of Sir Gawain".

The Vaughan Williams catalogue has an entry with Mrs Anna Brown of Fifeshire as the source singer, collected 1792 - 94.

Recordings
Steeleye Span included a version on the 1972 album Below the Salt.

Martin Carthy also recorded a version, currently available on Shearwater and The Carthy Chronicles: A Journey Through the Folk Revival disk 4 'Child:Carthy'.

Alexander James Adams, at the time recording as Heather Alexander included "King Henry-Black Nag" on the 2003 album Festival Wind.

Faun translated the song into German as "Herr Heinerich" for their album Buch der Balladen

The Furrow Collective recorded this on the album "At Our Next Meeting" (2014). .

See also
List of the Child Ballads

References

Child Ballads
Henry